Novo Tempo (Portuguese for "New Time") is a Portuguese Christian TV channel and Radio Station for Brazil. It is owned by the Seventh-day Adventist Church. Novo Tempo features programming produced by Adventist churches, colleges, hospitals and institutions, covering religious, health, educational and family life topics. Novo Tempo is a 24-hour broadcaster on satellite and cable networks in Brazil and is available over-the-air in some communities.

Novo Tempo is part of the Hope Channel network.

See also 

 Media ministries of the Seventh-day Adventist Church

References

External links 
 

Television networks in Brazil
Seventh-day Adventist media
Television channels and stations established in 2007